Berry Webb (15 April 1915 – 7 February 1983) was an Australian cricketer. He played in one first-class match for Queensland in 1937/38.

See also
 List of Queensland first-class cricketers

References

External links
 

1915 births
1983 deaths
Australian cricketers
Queensland cricketers
Cricketers from Brisbane